Augustine Kuta Mtiang'a, born 3rd May 2000, is a Kenyan offensive midfielder who currently features for Kenyan Premier League side Nairobi City Stars. He formerly turned out for lower tier sides Vihiga AllStars, Palos FC, Nairobi Stima, Kibera Black Stars and Kenyan Premier League side Western Stima F.C.

References

2000 births
Living people
Kenyan footballers
Nairobi City Stars players
Western Stima F.C. players
Kenyan Premier League players